James Dickson (1887 – 21 July 1970) was a New Zealand cricketer. He played in three first-class matches for Wellington from 1911 to 1915.

See also
 List of Wellington representative cricketers

References

External links
 

1887 births
1970 deaths
New Zealand cricketers
Wellington cricketers
Place of birth missing